The Cree (etc.) are a North American Indigenous people. They live primarily in Canada, where they form one of the country's largest First Nations.

In Canada, over 350,000 people are Cree or have Cree ancestry. The major proportion of Cree in Canada live north and west of Lake Superior, in Ontario, Manitoba, Saskatchewan, Alberta, and the Northwest Territories. About 27,000 live in Quebec.

In the United States, Cree people historically lived from Lake Superior westward. Today, they live mostly in Montana, where they share the Rocky Boy Indian Reservation with Ojibwe (Chippewa) people.

The documented westward migration over time has been strongly associated with their roles as traders and hunters in the North American fur trade.

Sub-groups and geography 

The Cree are generally divided into eight groups based on dialect and region. These divisions do not necessarily represent ethnic sub-divisions within the larger ethnic group:

 Naskapi and Montagnais (together known as the Innu) are inhabitants of an area they refer to as Nitassinan.  Their territories comprise most of the present-day political jurisdictions of eastern Quebec and Labrador. Their cultures are differentiated, as some of the Naskapi are still caribou hunters and more nomadic than many of the Montagnais. The Montagnais have more settlements. The total population of the two groups in 2003 was about 18,000 people, of which 15,000 lived in Quebec. Their dialects and languages are the most distinct from the Cree spoken by the groups west of Lake Superior.
Their population is around 8,000.
 East Cree – Grand Council of the Crees; approximately 18,000 Cree ( in Coastal Dialect /  in Inland Dialect) of Eeyou Istchee and Nunavik regions of Northern Quebec.
 Moose Cree – Moose Factory in the Northeastern Ontario; this group lives on Moose Factory Island, near the mouth of the Moose River, at the southern end of James Bay. ("Factory" used to refer to a trading post.)
 Swampy Cree – this group lives in northern Manitoba along the Hudson Bay coast and adjacent inland areas to the south and west, and in Ontario along the coast of Hudson Bay and James Bay. Some also live in eastern Saskatchewan around Cumberland House. Their dialect has 4,500 speakers.
 Woodland Cree and Rocky Cree  – a group in northern Alberta, Manitoba, and Saskatchewan.
 Plains Cree – a total of 34,000 people in Manitoba, Saskatchewan, Alberta, and Montana.

Due to the many dialects of the Cree language, the people have no modern collective autonym. Moose Cree, East Cree, Naskapi, and Montagnais all refer to themselves using modern dialectal forms of the historical , meaning 'man.' The Cree use "Cree," "cri," "Naskapi, or "montagnais" to refer to their people only when speaking French or English.

Political aboriginal organization

Historical 

As hunter-gatherers, the basic unit of organization for Cree peoples was the lodge, a group of perhaps eight or a dozen people, usually the families of two separate but related married couples, who lived together in the same wigwam (domed tent) or tipi (conical tent), and the band, a group of lodges who moved and hunted together. In the case of disagreement, lodges could leave bands and bands could be formed and dissolved with relative ease. However, as there is safety in numbers, all families would want to be part of some band, and banishment was considered a very serious punishment. Bands would usually have strong ties to their neighbours through intermarriage and would assemble together at different parts of the year to hunt and socialize together. Besides these regional gatherings, there was no higher-level formal structure, and decisions of war and peace were made by consensus with allied bands meeting together in council. People could be identified by their clan, which is a group of people claiming descent from the same common ancestor; each clan would have a representative and a vote in all important councils held by the band (compare: Anishinaabe clan system).

Each band remained independent of each other. However, Cree-speaking bands tended to work together and with their neighbours against outside enemies. Those Cree who moved onto the Great Plains and adopted bison hunting, called the Plains Cree, were allied with the Assiniboine, the Metis Nation, and the Saulteaux in what was known as the "Iron Confederacy", which was a major force in the North American fur trade from the 1730s to the 1870s. The Cree and the Assiniboine were important intermediaries in the Indian trading networks on the northern plains.

This office was different from that of the "peace chief", a leader who had a role more like that of diplomat. In the run-up to the 1885 North-West Rebellion, Big Bear was the leader of his band, but once the fighting started Wandering Spirit became war leader.

Contemporary 
There have been several attempts to create a national political organization that would represent all Cree peoples, at least as far back as a 1994 gathering at the Opaskwayak Cree First Nation reserve.

Name 
The name "Cree" is derived from the Algonkian-language exonym , which the Ojibwa used for tribes around Hudson Bay. The French used these terms to refer to various groups of peoples in Canada, some of which are now better distinguished as Severn Anishinaabe (Ojibwa), who speak dialects different from the Algonquin.

These names are derived from the historical autonym  (of uncertain meaning) or from the historical autonym  (meaning "person"). Cree using the latter autonym tend to be those living in the territories of Quebec and Labrador.

Language 

The Cree language (also known in the most broad classification as Cree-Montagnais, Cree-Montagnais-Naskapi, to show the groups included within it) is the name for a group of closely related Algonquian languages, the mother tongue (i.e. language first learned and still understood) of approximately 96,000 people, and the language most often spoken at home of about 65,000 people across Canada, from the Northwest Territories to Labrador. It is the most widely spoken aboriginal language in Canada. The only region where Cree has official status is in the Northwest Territories, together with eight other aboriginal languages.

The two major groups: Nehiyaw and Innu, speak a mutually intelligible Cree dialect continuum, which can be divided by many criteria. In a dialect continuum, "It is not so much a language, as a chain of dialects, where speakers from one community can very easily understand their neighbours, but a Plains Cree speaker from Alberta would find a Quebec Cree speaker difficult to speak to without practice."

There is also a major difference in grammatical vocabulary (particles) between the groups. "Cree is a not a typologically harmonic language. Cree has both prefixes and suffixes, both prepositions and postpositions, and both prenominal and postnominal modifiers (e.g. demonstratives can appear in both positions)."

Golla counts Cree dialects as eight of 55 North American languages that have more than 1,000 speakers and which are being actively acquired by children.

Identity and ethnicity

In Canada 

The Cree are the largest group of First Nations in Canada, with 220,000 members and 135 registered bands. Together, their reserve lands are the largest of any First Nations group in the country. The largest Cree band and the second largest First Nations Band in Canada after the Six Nations Iroquois is the Lac La Ronge Band in northern Saskatchewan.

Given the traditional Cree acceptance of mixed marriages, it is acknowledged by academics that all bands are ultimately of mixed heritage and multilingualism and multiculturalism was the norm. In the West, mixed bands of Cree, Saulteaux and Assiniboine, all partners in the Iron Confederacy, are the norm. However, in recent years, as indigenous languages have declined across western Canada where there were once three languages spoken on a given reserve, there may now only be one. This has led to a simplification of identity, and it has become "fashionable" for bands in many parts of Saskatchewan to identify as "Plains Cree" at the expense of a mixed Cree-Salteaux history. There is also a tendency for bands to recategorize themselves as "Plains Cree" instead of Woods Cree or Swampy Cree. Neal McLeod argues this is partly due to the dominant culture's fascination with Plains Indian culture as well as the greater degree of written standardization and prestige Plains Cree enjoys over other Cree dialects.

The Métis (from the French,  – of mixed ancestry) are people of mixed ancestry, such as Cree (or Anishinaabe) and French, English, or Scottish heritage. According to Aboriginal Affairs and Northern Development Canada, the Métis were historically the children of French fur traders and Cree women or, from unions of English or Scottish traders and northern Dene women (Anglo-Métis). The Métis National Council defines a Métis as "a person who self-identifies as Métis, is distinct from other Aboriginal peoples, is of historic Métis Nation Ancestry and who is accepted by the Métis Nation".

In the United States 
At one time the Cree lived in northern Minnesota, North Dakota and Montana. Today, American Cree are enrolled in the federally recognized Chippewa Cree tribe, located on the Rocky Boy Indian Reservation, and in minority as "Landless Cree" on the Fort Peck Indian Reservation and as "Landless Cree" and "Rocky Boy Cree" on the Fort Belknap Indian Reservation, all in Montana. The Chippewa Cree share the reservation with the Pembina Band of Chippewa Indians, who form the "Chippewa" (Ojibwa) half of the Chippewa Cree tribe. On the other Reservations, the Cree minority share the Reservation with the Assiniboine, Gros Ventre and Sioux tribes. Traditionally, the southern limits of the Cree territory in Montana were the Missouri River and the Milk River.

First contact 
In the south, contact was later. In 1732 in what is now northwestern Ontario, Pierre Gaultier de Varennes, sieur de La Vérendrye, met with an assembled group of 200 Cree warriors near present-day Fort Frances, as well as with the Monsoni, (a branch of the Ojibwe). Both groups had donned war paint in preparation to an attack on the Dakota and another group of Ojibwe.

After acquiring firearms from the HBC, the Cree moved as traders into the plains, acting as middlemen with the HBC.

First Nation communities

Naskapi

The Naskapi are the Innu First Nations inhabiting a region of northeastern Quebec and Labrador, Canada. The Naskapi are traditionally nomadic peoples, in contrast with the territorial Montagnais, the other segment of Innu. The Naskapi language and culture is quite different from the Montagnais, in which the dialect changes from y to n as in "Iiyuu" versus "Innu".  is the Innu dialect spoken by the Naskapi. Today, the Naskapi are settled into two communities: Kawawachikamach Quebec and Natuashish, Newfoundland and Labrador.

The village is in the reserve of the same name.

The Mushuau Innu First Nation, located in the community of Natuashish, Newfoundland and Labrador, is located in the Natuashish 2 reserve on the coast of Labrador.

Montagnais

Eastern Montagnais

Innu Takuaikan Uashat Mak Mani-Utenam based in Sept-Îles, Quebec, in the  region on the Saint Lawrence River.

Innu Nation of Matimekush-Lac John is based out of Schefferville, Quebec. One reserve, Matimekosh, is an enclave of Schefferville. The other, Lac-John, is  outside the town.

Première Nation des Innus de Nutashkuan is based on their reserve of Natashquan 1 or Nutashkuan. The reserve is located on the north shore of the Gulf of Saint Lawrence at the mouth of the Natashquan River.

 located in the community of Pakuashipi, Quebec, on the western shore of the mouth of the Saint-Augustin River on the north shore of the Gulf of Saint Lawrence in the  region. The community is adjacent to the settlement of Saint-Augustin.

 are located at La Romaine, Quebec at the mouth of the Olomane River on the Gulf of Saint Lawrence. They have one reserve; Romaine 2.

Sheshatshiu is located adjacent to the Inuit community of North West River. The Sheshatshiu Nation has one reserve, Sheshatshiu 3.

Western Montagnais

It is across the river directly north of Rimouski, Quebec.

Innue Essipit are based in their reserve of Essipit, adjacent to the village of Les Escoumins, Quebec.

Atikamekw

Conseil de la Nation Atikamekw, officially named Atikamekw Sipi – Conseil de la Nation Atikamekw, is a tribal council in Quebec, Canada. It is composed of three Atikamekw First Nations. The council is based in La Tuque, Quebec. The Atikamekw are inhabitants of the area they refer to as Nitaskinan ("Our Land"), in the upper Saint-Maurice River valley. The First Nations:

 Atikamekw d'Opitciwan live in Obedjiwan, Quebec on the north shore of Gouin Reservoir in the Mauricie region. Their reserve, Obedjiwan 28, contains the community.
 Atikamekw of Manawan are based in Manawan, Quebec, on the south-western shores of Lake Métabeskéga in the Lanaudière region.
The Nation owns two reserves; the first is around Wemotaci while the second is Coucoucache 24 on the north shore of Reservoir Blanc on the Saint-Maurice River. Coucoucache 24 is not inhabited and is only accessible by boat.

James Bay Cree

Eeyou Istchee is a territory equivalent to a regional county municipality (TE) of Nord-du-Québec represented by the Grand Council of the Crees. On 24 July 2012, the Quebec government signed an accord with the Cree Nation that resulted in the abolition of the neighbouring municipality of Baie-James and the creation of the new Eeyou Istchee James Bay Regional Government, providing for the residents of surrounding Jamésie TE and Eeyou Istchee to jointly govern the territory formerly governed by the municipality of Baie-James. Eeyou Istchee is a territory of eight enclaves within Jamésie plus one enclave (Whapmagoostui) within Kativik TE. Each enclave is a combination of a Cree reserved land (TC) and a Cree village municipality (VC), both with the same name.

 Cree Nation of Chisasibi is at the Cree village of Chisasibi on the south shore of La Grande River on the eastern shore of James Bay. The Nation's reserve is Chisasibi TC. Chisasibi is accessible via road and its airport.
 Eastmain (Cree Nation) is located at Eastmain VC and Eastmain TC is the reserve. The Nation is located on the east coast of James Bay at the mouth of the Eastmain River.
 Cree Nation of Mistissini is based in the Cree village of Mistissini, located in the south-east corner of the largest natural lake in Quebec, Lake Mistassini. The associated reserve is Mistissini TC.
 Cree Nation of Nemaska is headquartered at Nemaska VC and its reserve is Nemaska TC located on the western shores of Lake Champion. The village is the seat of the Grand Council of the Crees.
 Oujé-Bougoumou Cree Nation is located in the Cree village of Oujé-Bougoumou on the shores of Opémisca Lake. Oujé-Bougoumou is unique from the other Nations of Eeyou Istchee in that it doesn't have an associated reserve. The village is  due west of Chibougamau.
 The Crees of the Waskaganish First Nation is located at Waskaganish VC at the mouth of the Rupert River on the south-east shore of James Bay. The associated reserve is Waskaganish TC. Founded in 1668 as Charles Fort, two years before the creation of the HBC, the community is on the site of the first fur trading post of the Hudson's Bay Company. After the HBC was formed, the community was known as Fort Rupert, Rupert Fort, or Rupert House after Prince Rupert of the Rhine, the first governor of the HBC.
 Cree First Nation of Waswanipi is located in the Cree village of Waswanipi and the reserve is Waswanipi TC. The Nation is located near the confluence of the Chibougamau and Waswanipi Rivers.
 Cree Nation of Wemindji is headquartered at Wemindji VC and its reserve is Wemindji TC.
 First Nation of Whapmagoostui located at Whapmagoostui VC, is the northernmost Cree village, located at the mouth of the Great Whale River on the coast of Hudson Bay in Kativik TE. The village is just south of the river while the Inuit village of Kuujjuarapik is on the north shore.
 Cree Nation of Washaw Sibi was recognized as the tenth Cree Nation Community at the 2003 Annual General Assembly of the Cree Nation. The Nation does not yet have a community or reserve recognized by either the Canadian or Quebec governments but the Nation has chosen an area about 40 minutes' drive south of Matagami.

Moose Cree

Moose Cree ( or ), also known as Moosonee are located in Northeastern Ontario.

Constance Lake First Nation is the only Cree member of Matawa First Nations. They are located on their reserves, Constance Lake 92 and English River 66, in the Cochrane District, Ontario.

Mushkegowuk Council, based in Moose Factory, Ontario, represents chiefs from seven First Nations across Ontario. Moose Cree members are: Chapleau Cree First Nation, Kashechewan First Nation, Missanabie Cree First Nation, Moose Cree First Nation, and Taykwa Tagamou Nation. The Chapleau Cree First Nation and their two reserves, Chapleau Cree Fox Lake and Chapleau 75, are located outside of Chapleau, Ontario in the Sudbury District. The Kashechewan First Nation community is located on the northern shore of the Albany River on James Bay. The Hudson's Bay Company established a post, Fort Albany, at this location between 1675 and 1679. Kashechewan First Nation is one of two communities that were established from Old Fort Albany, the other being Fort Albany First Nation. The two Nations share the Fort Albany 67 reserve. The Missanabie Cree First Nation signed Treaty 9 in 1906 but did not receive any reserved lands until 2018. The Missanabie reserve is in the Missanabie, Ontario area. The Moose Cree First Nation is based in Moose Factory in the Cochrane District. Moose Factory was founded in 1672–1673 by Charles Bayly, the first overseas governor of the Hudson's Bay Company, and was the company's second post. It was the first English settlement in what is now Ontario. The Taykwa Tagamou Nation has two reserves, New Post 69, and their main reserve, New Post 69A outside Cochrane, Ontario along the Abitibi River.

Wabun Tribal Council is a regional chief's council based in Timmins, Ontario representing Ojibway and Cree First Nations in northern Ontario. Moose Cree members are: Brunswick House First Nation and Matachewan First Nation. Brunswick House's reserves are Mountbatten 76A and Duck Lake 76B located in the Sudbury District near Chapleau, Ontario. The Matachewan First Nation is on the Matachewan 72 reserve near Matachewan township in the Timiskaming District.

Swampy Cree

Located in Ontario

Fort Severn First Nation and their reserve, Fort Severn 89, located on the mouth of the Severn River on Hudson Bay, is the most northern community in Ontario. It is a member of Keewaytinook Okimakanak Council.

Mushkegowuk Council, based in Moose Factory, Ontario, represents chiefs from seven First Nations across Ontario. Swampy Cree members are: Fort Albany First Nation and Attawapiskat First Nation. Fort Albany First Nation is located at Fort Albany, Ontario, on the southern shore of the Albany River at James Bay. The reserve, Fort Albany 67, is shared with the Kashechewan First Nation. The Attawapiskat First Nation is located at mouth of the Attawapiskat River on James Bay. The community is on the Attawapiskat 91A reserve.

Independent from a Tribal Council is the Weenusk First Nation located in Peawanuck in the Kenora District. The community was located on their reserve of Winisk 90 on the mouth of the Winisk River on James Bay but the community was destroyed in the 1986 Winisk flood and the community had to be relocated to Peawanuck.

Located in Manitoba
Keewatin Tribal Council is a Tribal Council based in Thompson, Manitoba that represents eleven First Nations, of which five are Swampy Cree, across northern Manitoba. Shamattawa First Nation is located on their reserve, Shamattawa 1, on the banks of the Gods River where the Echoing River joins. The community is very remote; only connected via air or via winter ice roads to other First Nation communities. York Factory was a settlement and Hudson's Bay Company (HBC) trading post, established in 1684, on the shore of Hudson Bay, at the mouth of the Hayes River. In 1956, the trading post was closed and the community was moved inland to the current site.

Swampy Cree Tribal Council is, as the name suggests, a tribal council of seven Swampy Cree First Nations across northern Manitoba and is based in The Pas. Mathias Colomb First Nation (also Rocky Cree) is located in the community of Pukatawagan on the Pukatawagan 198 reserve. Opaskwayak Cree Nation (also Rocky Cree) has several reserves but most of the population lives on the Opaskwayak 21E reserve, immediately north of and across the Saskatchewan River from The Pas.

Not affiliated with any Tribal Council: Fisher River Cree Nation, Marcel Colomb First Nation, and Norway House Cree Nation. Norway House Cree Nation is located in Norway House which is located on the Playgreen Lake section of the Nelson River system on the north side of Lake Winnipeg. In 1821, Norway House became the principal inland fur trading depot for the Hudson's Bay Company. Norway House was also where Treaty 5 was signed. The Nation is one of the most populous in Canada with 8,599 people .

Located in Saskatchewan

Prince Albert Grand Council is based in Prince Albert, Saskatchewan and is owned by twelve First Nations of which three are Swampy Cree. Cumberland House, founded in 1774 by Samuel Hearne, was the site of the HBC's first inland fur-trading post. The Red Earth First Nation is located in the community of Red Earth, on the banks of the Carrot River, on the Carrot River 29A reserve.

Woodland Cree

Rocky Cree

The Keewatin Tribal Council, described under Swampy Cree, also represents Rocky Cree First Nations in Manitoba. The Barren Lands First Nation is located on the north shore of Reindeer Lake close to the Saskatchewan border. The Bunibonibee Cree Nation is located along the eastern shoreline of Oxford Lake at the headwaters of the Hayes River. God's Lake First Nation is located in the God's Lake Narrows area on the shore of God's Lake. All of the Rocky Cree communities of Keewatin Tribal Council are remote; only connected via air and ice road during winter months.

Five of the Swampy Cree Tribal Council First Nations contain Rocky Cree populations: Chemawawin Cree Nation, Mathias Colomb First Nation, Misipawistik Cree Nation, Mosakahiken Cree Nation, Opaskwayak Cree Nation.

In Saskatchewan, the Prince Albert Grand Council, described under Swampy Cree, also has Rocky Cree members. The Lac La Ronge First Nation is one of the most populous First Nations in Canada with a registered population of 11,604 . The Nation is based in La Ronge on the Lac la Ronge 156 reserve but has other communities on other reserves. Peter Ballantyne Cree Nation is also a populous First Nation with 11,563 people .

Not affiliated with any Tribal Council are Cross Lake First Nation, Nisichawayasihk Cree Nation, and O-Pipon-Na-Piwin Cree Nation. The Cross Lake First Nation is a populous Nation with a registered population of 9,138 people . Marcel Colomb First Nation, listed under Swampy Cree, also has a Rocky Cree population.

Woods Cree

The Canoe Lake Cree First Nation is based in Canoe Narrows, Saskatchewan on the Canoe Lake 165 reserve. The Nation is a member of the Meadow Lake Tribal Council.

The Nation is not associated with a Tribal Council. The Bigstone Cree Nation was divided into two bands in 2010, with one group continuing under the former name, and the other becoming the Peerless Trout First Nation.

They are the only Cree member of the Athabasca Tribal Council.

Kee Tas Kee Now Tribal Council is based in Atikameg, Alberta with five members: The Loon River First Nation is headquartered in Red Earth Creek with reserves to the immediate west near Loon Lake. The 

Lesser Slave Lake Indian Regional Council, based out of the town of Slave Lake, Alberta is, as the name suggests, a Tribal Council of First Nations surrounding Lesser Slave Lake.
The Kapawe'no First Nation is headquartered at Grouard, which is near High Prairie. They have six reserves, predominately located west of Lesser Slave Lake. The Sawridge First Nation is based in Slave Lake and the two reserves, Sawridge 150G and 150H, are adjacent to the town.

They are a member of the North Peace Tribal Council based out of High Level, Alberta.

They are not a member of a Tribal Council. Fort Chipewyan, one of the oldest European settlements in Alberta, was established in 1788 by the North West Company as a fur trading post.

Western Cree Tribal Council is based out of Valleyview, Alberta.

Plains Cree

Downstream people
Battlefords Agency Tribal Chiefs is a tribal council located in North Battleford, Saskatchewan. Members are: Ahtahkakoop First Nation, Moosomin First Nation, Mosquito-Grizzly Bear's Head-Lean Man, Red Pheasant First Nation, Saulteaux First Nation, and Sweetgrass First Nation.

File Hills Qu'Appelle Tribal Council is a tribal council based in Fort Qu'Appelle, Saskatchewan.  Cree member Nations are: Little Black Bear First Nation, Muscowpetung Saulteaux Nation, Nekaneet Cree Nation, Okanese First Nation, Pasqua First Nation, Peepeekisis Cree Nation, Piapot Cree Nation, and Star Blanket Cree Nation

Meadow Lake Tribal Council is a tribal council based in Meadow Lake, Saskatchewan with nine member First Nations. The members with Plains Cree populations are Flying Dust First Nation, Makwa Sahgaiehcan First Nation, Ministikwan Lake Cree Nation, and Waterhen Lake First Nation

Saskatoon Tribal Council is, as the name suggests, a tribal council that is based out of Saskatoon, Saskatchewan. Cree member Nations are: Mistawasis Nêhiyawak, Muskeg Lake Cree Nation, Muskoday First Nation, and One Arrow First Nation.

Touchwood Agency Tribal Council, based in Punnichy, Saskatchewan, is a tribal council of four First Nations, collectively known as the Touchwood Hills Cree. The Cree Nations are: Day Star First Nation, George Gordon First Nation, Kawacatoose First Nation, and Muskowekwan First Nation.

Yorkton Tribal Council is a tribal council based in Yorkton, Saskatchewan. Cree members are: Kahkewistahaw First Nation and Ocean Man First Nation.

Without affiliation with any tribal council: Beardy's and Okemasis' Cree Nation, Cowessess First Nation, Ochapowace Nation, Onion Lake Cree Nation, Pheasant Rump Nakota First Nation, White Bear First Nations.

Upstream people

Agency Chiefs Tribal Council is a tribal council located in Spiritwood, Saskatchewan representing three First Nations: Pelican Lake First Nation, Big River First Nation, and Witchekan Lake First Nation.

Battlefords Tribal Council is based in North Battleford, Saskatchewan, The three member Nations are Lucky Man Cree Nation, Little Pine First Nation, and Poundmaker First Nation.

Interlake Reserves Tribal Council is a tribal council based in Fairford, Manitoba. The council has six Nations as members but the only Cree member is Peguis First Nation.

Without affiliation with any tribal council: Big Island Lake Cree Nation, Thunderchild First Nation.

Tribal Chiefs Ventures is a tribal council based in Edmonton with the following Cree members: Beaver Lake Cree Nation, Heart Lake First Nation, Frog Lake First Nation, and Kehewin Cree Nation.

Beaver Hills Cree

The members are Ermineskin Cree Nation, Louis Bull Tribe, Montana First Nation, and Samson Cree Nation. All four members have individual reserves that surround the community of Maskwacis: Ermineskin 138, Louis Bull 138B, Montana 139, Samson 137, and Samson 137A.

Yellowhead Tribal Council is based in Morinville, Alberta. Member nations are: Alexander First Nation, Alexis Nakota Sioux First Nation, O'Chiese First Nation, and Sunchild First Nation.

Not affiliated with any Tribal Council: Enoch Cree Nation, Paul First Nation, and Saddle Lake Cree Nation Enoch Cree Nation is located on their main reserve, Enoch Cree Nation 135, adjacent to the western boundary of the city of Edmonton. Saddle Lake Cree Nation is one of the most populous Nations in Canada with 11,235 people .

United States

Fort Peck Indian Reservation located near Fort Peck, Montana

Chippewa Cree on the Rocky Boy's Indian Reservation in northern Montana

Fort Belknap Indian Reservation located at Fort Belknap Agency, Montana

Other First Nations
Papaschase First Nation, removed from land that now makes up southeast Edmonton, were a party to Treaty 6 but are not recognized by the Canadian government.

Ethnobotany 
The Cree use the pitch of Abies balsamea for menstrual irregularity, and take an infusion of the bark and sometimes the wood for coughs. They use the pitch and grease used as an ointment for scabies and boils. They apply a poultice of pitch applied to cuts. They also use a decoction of pitch and sturgeon oil used for tuberculosis, and take an infusion of bark for tuberculosis. They also use the boughs to make brush shelters and use the wood to make paddles.

Hudson Bay Cree subgroup
The Hudson Bay Cree use a decoction of the leaves of Kalmia angustifolia for diarrhea, but they consider the plant to be poisonous.

Woods Cree subgroup
The Woods Cree make use of Ribes glandulosum using a decoction of the stem, either by itself or mixed with wild red raspberry, to prevent clotting after birth, eat the berries as food, and use the stem to make a bitter tea. They make use of Vaccinium myrtilloides, using a decoction of leafy stems used to bring menstruation and prevent pregnancy, to make a person sweat, to slow excessive menstrual bleeding, to bring blood after childbirth, and to prevent miscarriage. They also use the berries to dye porcupine quills, eat the berries raw, make them into jam and eat it with fish and bannock, and boil or pound the sun-dried berries into pemmican. They use the berries of the minus subspecies of Vaccinium myrtilloides to colour porcupine quills, and put the firm, ripe berries on a string to wear as a necklace. They also incorporate the berries of the minus subspecies of Vaccinium myrtilloides into their cuisine. They store the berries by freezing them outside during the winter, mix the berries with boiled fish eggs, livers, air bladders and fat and eat them, eat the berries raw as a snack food, and stew them with fish or meat.

Cree people 

 Janice Acoose, author, of Sakimay (Saulteaux) and Ninankawe Marival Métis ancestry
 Nathaniel Arcand (Alexander First Nation), actor
 Ethan Bear, (b. 1997), NHL hockey player for the Carolina Hurricanes
 Irene Bedard, actress
 Robyn Bourgeois, author and academic
 Joe Buffalo, actor and skateboarder
 Ashley Callingbull-Burnham (Enoch Cree Nation), 2015 Mrs. Universe winner, actress and first nations activist
 Harold Cardinal, writer, political leader, teacher, and lawyer
 Lorne Cardinal, actor
 Tantoo Cardinal, actor
 Jonathan Cheechoo, NHL and KHL hockey player
 Shirley Cheechoo, actress, writer, and filmmaker
 Vern Cheechoo, musician
 Belinda Daniels, language teacher
 Billy Diamond, political leader, first Grand Chief of the Grand Council of the Crees (Eeyou Istchee)
 Neil Diamond, filmmaker
 Connie Fife, poet
 Theoren Fleury, retired NHL hockey player, humanitarian, spokesperson, and author
 Ralph Garvin Steinhauer, tenth Lieutenant Governor of Alberta and first Aboriginal to hold that post.
 Edward Gamblin, musician
 Mary Greyeyes (1920–2011), the first First Nations woman to join the Canadian Armed Forces
 Michael Greyeyes, actor
 Tomson Highway, playwright, librettist of the first Cree-language opera
 Tyson Houseman, actor
 Helen Knott, activist and author
 Melina Laboucan-Massimo, climate justice advocate
 Cody Lightning, actor
 Lawrence Martin, musician and politician
 Ovide Mercredi, National chief of the Assembly of First Nations
 Delia Opekokew, lawyer and activist
 Bronson Pelletier, actor
 Romeo Saganash, Member of Parliament for Abitibi—Baie-James—Nunavik—Eeyou, Quebec
 Buffy Sainte-Marie, singer
 Paul Seesequasis, writer and journalist
 Roseanne Supernault, actress
 Clayton Thomas-Müller, activist and memoirist
 Richard Throssel (1882–1933), photographer
 Michelle Thrush, actor
 Loretta Todd, film director
 Gordon Tootoosis, actor
 Shane Yellowbird, country singer
 Alfred Young Man (Chippewa Cree Indians of the Rocky Boy's Reservation, b. 1948), educator, writer, curator, and artist

See also 
 Cree syllabics
  (Cree law)
 James Bay Cree hydroelectric conflict
 Michif
 Shaking Tent Ceremony

Notes

References

External links 

 Cree cultural site
 The East Cree language web
 The Cree-Innu linguistic atlas
 Grand Council of the Crees (GCC) and Cree Nation Government – Official website
Canada Government – Summary of the Agreement on the Cree Nation Governance
Quebec Government – Cree of Quebec
 The Plains Cree – Ethnographic, Historical and Comparative Study by David Mandelbaum
 Lac La Ronge Band website
 Little Red River Cree Nation website
 Brief history of Cree from Canadian Geographic
 CBC Digital Archives – James Bay Project and the Cree
 Pimooteewin, a first Cree language opera
 Fisher River Cree Nation Official Website
 The Gift of Language and Culture website
 CBC Digital Archives – Eeyou Istchee: Land of the Cree

Cree
Algonquian peoples
First Nations in Alberta
First Nations in British Columbia
First Nations in Manitoba
First Nations in Ontario
First Nations in Quebec
First Nations in Saskatchewan
First Nations in the Northwest Territories
Great Lakes tribes
Plains tribes
Native American tribes in Montana